Corpus Córporum (Lat. "the collection of collections") or in full, Corpus Córporum: repositorium operum latinorum apud universitatem Turicensem, is a digital Medieval Latin library developed by the University of Zurich, Institute for Greek and Latin Philology. As of May 2016, the repository contains a total of 137,982,350 words, including the entire Patrologia Latina, the Vulgate, Corpus Thomisticum and numerous other medieval and Neo-Latin collections of religious, literary and scientific texts.

Development
The non-commercial site, still under development (in statu nascendi) at mlat.uzh.ch, is conceived as a text (meta-)repository with a set of research tools. It is being developed under the direction of Phillip Roelli, and it uses only free and open software.

The project aims to provide a platform for standardised (TEI) xml-files of copyright-free Latin texts; to make the texts searchable in complex manners; and to function as an online platform for the publication of Latin texts (e.g. the Richard Rufus Project's corpus at Stanford University).

Texts are divided into searchable corpora on specific topics, e.g. one corpus consists of ten Latin translations of Aristotle's Physica.

See also
 Christian Classics Ethereal Library
 Etymologiae
 LacusCurtius
 Library of Latin Texts
 Perseus Project
 Thesaurus Linguae Latinae

References

External links
 Project Home page.
 Institute for Greek and Latin Philology.
 An external reference.
 A mention at H-Europe.
 University of Zurich Institute for Greek and Latin Philology
 Richard Rufus Project's corpus at Stanford University

Swiss digital libraries
Computing in classical studies
Corpora
Educational projects
Latin-language literature
Medieval Latin literature
Online Scripture Search Engine
Publications of patristic texts
Text Encoding Initiative
Thesauri
University of Zurich